Godzilla's/Eatin' Dust (alternatively titled (Godzilla's) Eatin' Dust or simply Eatin' Dust) is the fifth studio album by American stoner rock band Fu Manchu, released on February 19, 1999, on the now defunct Man's Ruin label. The album combines what were originally two limited 10" releases: "Godzilla" (1997) and "Eatin' Dust" (1999).

Godzilla's/Eatin' Dust was the second album for new members Brant Bjork and Bob Balch, who replaced Ruben Romano and Eddie Glass in 1997. Josh Homme of Kyuss and Queens of the Stone Age played lead guitar in place of Bob Balch (under the alias of Mike Coopersmith), additional percussion and produced the three-track "Godzilla" session. The rest of the album features the band's normal lineup.

Several versions of the album have been released in various formats. It was re-issued on Elastic Records in 2004 with different track order and artwork. In 2010, the band's own At The Dojo Records re-issued the album again, with the same track order and slightly different artwork.

In 2019, the album was again re-issued with four previously-unreleased tracks as Godzilla's/Eatin' Dust +4. The added tracks, also from the original "Godzilla" sessions, are early versions of three songs that later appeared on 1997's The Action Is Go, and a cover of Thin Lizzy's "Jailbreak" (a different version than that released on the 1998 "Jailbreak" 7").

"Godzilla" is a Blue Öyster Cult cover.

Track listing 
All tracks by Fu Manchu except where noted.

10" vinyl 1997 (MR-048) titled "Godzilla":
 "Godzilla" – 4:31 (Donald "Buck Dharma" Roeser)
 "Module Overload" – 4:16
 "Living Legend" – 5:08

10" vinyl 1999 (MR-157) titled "Eatin' Dust":
 "Eatin' Dust" – 3:08
 "Shift Kicker" – 3:00
 "Orbiter" – 3:13
 "Mongoose" – 6:12

CD 1999 (MR-157 cd) titled as Eatin' Dust; LP 1999 (MR-163) titled as (Godzilla's) Eatin' Dust:
 "Godzilla" – 4:31
 "Module Overload" – 4:16
 "Living Legend" – 5:08
 "Eatin' Dust" – 3:08
 "Shift Kicker" – 3:00
 "Orbiter" – 3:13
 "Mongoose" – 6:12
 "Pigeon Toe" – 4:45

CD 2004 (ELS-023) titled as (Godzilla's) Eatin' Dust; CD/LP 2010 (ATD004-2) titled as Godzilla'a/Eatin' Dust:
 "Eatin' Dust" – 3:08
 "Shift Kicker" – 3:00
 "Orbiter" – 3:13
 "Mongoose" – 6:12
 "Pigeon Toe" – 4:45
 "Module Overload" – 4:16
 "Living Legend" – 5:08
 "Godzilla" – 4:31

All Formats 2019 (MR-175) titled as Godzilla's/Eatin' Dust +4 (ATDO16)
 "Eatin' Dust" – 3:08
 "Shift Kicker" – 3:00
 "Orbiter" – 3:13
 "Mongoose" – 6:12
 "Pigeon Toe" – 4:45
 "Module Overload" – 4:16
 "Living Legend" – 5:08
 "Godzilla" – 4:31
 "Grendel, Snowman" – 3:36
 "Strolling Astronomer" – 4:07
 "Urethane" – 4:30
 "Jailbreak" – 3:58 (Phil Lynott)

Personnel 
Scott Hill – vocals, guitar
Brant Bjork – drums
Bob Balch – lead guitar
Brad Davis – bass guitar
Produced by Fu Manchu

Production
Engineered and Mixed by Steve Feldman
Assistant Engineer: Frank Hanyak
"Godzilla" session tracks recorded at Rancho De La Luna, Joshua Tree, CA on October 19, 1996
"Eatin' Dust" session tracks recorded at Monkey Studios, Palm Springs, CA on November 22, 1998
Mastered by Future Disc
Management: Catherine Enny/Guerrilla MGMT Collective

References 

1999 albums
Fu Manchu (band) albums
Man's Ruin Records albums